Thelairodoriopsis is a genus of parasitic flies in the family Tachinidae.

Species
Thelairodoriopsis maracasi Thompson, 1968
Thelairodoriopsis sobrina (Wulp, 1890)

Distribution
Peru.

References

Diptera of North America
Exoristinae
Tachinidae genera